Eoophyla boernickei is a moth in the family Crambidae. It was described by Wolfram Mey in 2006. It is found on Sabah in Malaysia.

References

External links

Eoophyla
Moths described in 2006